Athrotaxis selaginoides is a species of Athrotaxis, endemic to Tasmania in Australia, where it grows at 400–1,120 m altitude. In its habitat in the mountains, snow in winter is very usual. It is often called King Billy Pine or King William Pine (believed to be in reference to William Lanne, an Aboriginal Tasmanian man), although it is not a true pine.

Description
It is an evergreen coniferous tree growing to 20–30 m tall, with a trunk up to 1.5 m diameter. The leaves are claw-like, 7–18 mm long and 3–4 mm broad, arranged spirally on the shoots. The seed cones are globose, 15–30 mm diameter, with 20–30 spirally-arranged scales; they are mature about six months after pollination. The pollen cones are 4–5 mm long.

Decline
The main cause of past decline has been fire, with about one third of its habitat burnt in the twentieth century. Like the other two Athrotaxis species, A. selaginoides is sensitive to fire. Another cause of past decline has been logging. The overall decline is estimated to be about 40% over the last 200 years. This is within the three generation time limit where one generation is estimated to be at least 100 years. Although 84% of forests are now in protected areas, fires still are a potential hazard. Tasmanian government policy precludes logging of this species in and outside these protected areas.

Cultivation
Examples of the species can be viewed at The Tasmanian Arboretum.
Away from its native range, it is occasionally cultivated as an ornamental tree in northwestern Europe. It succeeds in Scotland where it receives the necessary rainfalls for its good growth and produces fertile seeds there.

References

Cupressaceae
Endemic flora of Tasmania
Pinales of Australia
Trees of Australia
Trees of mild maritime climate
Ornamental trees
Vulnerable flora of Australia
Taxonomy articles created by Polbot